Azam Jangravi, (Persian: اعظم جنگروی; born June 9, 1983 in Tehran) is an Iranian paralegal and human rights advocate , and former political prisoner who lives in Toronto, Canada. She is primarily famous for being one of The Girls of Enghelab during the Iranian protests against compulsory hijab. She protested the compulsory hijab in Enqelab Street by removing her scarf on top of an electricity transformer box and waving it above her head.

Azam was taken in custody by Islamic Republic Regime on February 15, 2018 and was released later temporarily on bail.

Early life and career in Iran
Azam was born in Tehran, the fifth child of Mostafa Jangravi and Mehry. She spent her childhood years in the southern part of Tehran and moved to the northern part years later when she was an adolescent. She was raised in a traditional religious family and had to marry by the age of 22 as her mother pressured her.

She married Saeed, a conservative religious person whose family obliged Azam to wear Hijab everywhere.

Azam obtained Computer Science Bachelor's Degree from University of Tehran. Later, she continued her studies for Masters in AI and Robotics. 

Azam got pregnant with her daughter Viana in 2009. The couple never got along and as their quarrels got worsen by the time, She decided not to raise her daughter in that environment. Azam filed a divorce but as the laws and regulations of the Islamic Republic are against women's rights, it took her 4 years to finalize it.

Activism
On December 27, 2017, during antigovernmental protests in Iran, Vida Movahed climbed on an electricity transformer box on Tehran's Enghelab St. She removed her headscarf, tied it to a stick and waved it while standing calmly at the crowd that gathered to protest to the compulsory hijab. She was immediately arrested by the police, but she got the name "the first Girl of Enghelab Street".

Many women later reenacted Movahed's action in multiple spots in Tehran, and Jangravi was one of them. She went atop an electricity transformer box and waved her scarf as Movahed did. After the police arrested Jangravi, they put her in solitary confinement and left her there for ten days. She was released later temporarily on bail. In an interview she mentioned that she was sentenced to three years in jail for "promoting indecency and wilfully breaking Islamic law".

She was also threatened to take away custody of her child to her ex-husband or transfer her child to social services. Following that, she fled the country to Turkey and later moved to Canada.

References

Living people
Iranian women's rights activists
Iranian emigrants to Canada
University of Tehran alumni
Year of birth missing (living people)